Khankawn is a village in the Champhai district of Mizoram, India. It is located in the Khawbung R.D. Block.

Demographics 

According to the 2011 census of India, Khankawn has 124 households. The effective literacy rate (i.e. the literacy rate of population excluding children aged 6 and below) is 96.21%. C. Vanlalsanga is the President of MZP Khankawn Branch.

References 

Villages in Khawbung block